13 East Street is a 1952 British crime thriller film directed by Robert S. Baker and starring Patrick Holt,  Sandra Dorne and Sonia Holm.

It was shot at Twickenham Studios with some location shooting around London. The film's sets were designed by the art director Andrew Mazzei. It was produced as a second feature by Tempean Films which specialised in producing films designed to support the main feature on a double bill during the early 1950s.

Synopsis
In order to break up a gang trading in stolen goods, a Scotland Yard detective goes undercover. He robs a jewellery shop and is sentenced to prison so that he can gain the confidence of the gang's leaders and infiltrate their organisation.

Cast
 Patrick Holt as Insp. Gerald Blake
 Sandra Dorne as Judy
 Sonia Holm as Joan Blake
 Robert Ayres as 	Larry Conn
 Dora Bryan as Valerie
 Michael Balfour as Joey Long
 Hector MacGregor as Supt. Duncan 
 Michael Brennan as George Mack
 Alan Judd as Sgt. Follett
 Michael Ward as Barman
 Alan Gordon as Murray
 Harry Towb as Ray
 Frank Forsyth as Prison Officer 
 Edward Evans as Van Driver
 Charles Paton as Jeweller
 Barry MacGregor as Boy with football
 Andreas Malandrinos as Cafe Owner

References

Bibliography
 Mackillop, Ian & Sinyard, Neil. British Cinema of the 1950s: A Celebration. Manchester University Press,  2018.

External links
 

1952 films
1952 crime films
1950s crime thriller films
1950s English-language films
British crime thriller films
Films directed by Robert S. Baker
Films set in London
Films shot in London
Films shot at Twickenham Film Studios
1950s British films